"Pretty Girls" is a song performed by British Virgin Islands recording artist Iyaz, released on 24 June 2011. The song features vocals from American rapper Travie McCoy. The song has peaked at number 43 on the U.S Billboard Hot 100.

Music video
A music video to accompany the release of "Pretty Girls" was first released onto YouTube on 17 August 2011. Sean Kingston and Soulja Boy Tell 'Em make cameo appearances in the video.

Remix
Featuring rappers Ludacris and Mario Winans

Track listings
 US digital download
 "Pretty Girls" (feat. Travie McCoy) – 3:43

Chart performance

Release history

References

2011 singles
Iyaz songs
Travie McCoy songs
Reprise Records singles
Songs written by Marty James
Song recordings produced by J. R. Rotem
2011 songs